Events from the year 1234 in Ireland.

Incumbent
Lord: Henry III

Events
1 April – Battle of the Curragh in County Kildare: forces loyal to King Henry III of England defeat those led by Richard Marshal, Earl of Pembroke and Lord of Leinster who later dies from wounds received.

Deaths
16 April – Richard Marshal, 3rd Earl of Pembroke (born 1191).

References

 
1230s in Ireland
Ireland
Years of the 13th century in Ireland